Rafferty “Raff” Law (born 1996) is an English model, musician and actor.

Early life
Law attended Bedales School in Hampshire. He appeared in his first play aged five or six in a school production of Pinocchio. He also played Long John Silver in a production of Treasure Island.

Career

Music
Law was in the band Outer Stella Overdrive with Kelvin Bueno, who was introduced to him by his sister Iris as “they had such similar taste in music”. The band expanded to include keyboardist Amin El Makkawi, and drummer Ruby Albarn, nephew of Damon Albarn. The band released their debut single State Your Name, in 2018. Law and Bueno would share lyric writing duties. The band The released their debut EP Clout & Self Doubt in 2021.

Model
Law walked for DKNY in 2014 whilst still a teenager. His first magazine cover was in 2016 for L’Officiel Hommes Netherlands. Law walked for Dolce and Gabbana during Milan Fashion Week. He has also worked with the likes of Missoma, Valentino, Mulberry and Brioni.

Acting
He appears in The Hat, a 2020 short film starring Raff with his father Jude Law, which shot on an iPhone during the covid-19 pandemic lockdown, and has a musical score by Pete Townshend, and raised money for the Teenage Cancer Trust and Teen Cancer America. The short won the Spirit Of The Festival Award at the Raindance Film Festival in November 2020. It was the first time Raff and Jude had appeared on film together.

Law appeared as Oliver Twist in the 2021 film Twist, a modern re-telling of the Dickens tale, with Michael Caine and Rita Ora. In April 2021 he was cast as Sgt. Ken Lemmons in the Apple TV+ series Masters of the Air as part of an ensemble cast including Austin Butler.

Personal life
He is the son of actors Jude Law and Sadie Frost. He has a sister called Iris and a brother called Rudy.

Filmography

References

External links

Male actors from London
Musicians from London
Models from London
Living people
Date of birth unknown